The Early Warning and Response System (EWRS) for communicable diseases in the European Union was created by the European Commission to "ensure a rapid and effective response by the EU to events (including emergencies) related to communicable diseases."

Brexit and COVID-19 
In 2020, the Department of Health and Social Care requested that the United Kingdom should keep its access to the EWRS after Brexit in order to combat the global COVID-19 outbreak. This was supported by numerous medical experts and organizations, with Niall Dickson, chief executive of the NHS Confederation, stating that EWRS access was essential to maintain the best possible response. The request was denied by Boris Johnson's government for political reasons, to preserve the government's bargaining position in post-Brexit negotiations.

Sources

Further reading
Eurosurveillance article The Early Warning and Response System for communicable diseases in the EU: an overview from 1999 to 2005. (Euro Surveill 2006;11(12):215–220.) December 2006

Epidemiology
Health in Europe
Disaster preparedness in Europe